Sovetskaya is a street about one kilometer long in the historical centre of Astrakhan, Russia. It forms the heart of the White Town historic district. It begins near the walls of the Astrakhan Kremlin stretching from Trediakovski to Kalinine Streets. Its modern name literally means 'the Soviet'.

Streets in Astrakhan